Stanisław Lubiejewski (born 27 May 1947) is a Polish athlete. He competed in the men's hammer throw at the 1972 Summer Olympics.

References

1947 births
Living people
Athletes (track and field) at the 1972 Summer Olympics
Polish male hammer throwers
Olympic athletes of Poland
People from Lower Silesian Voivodeship